"Don't You Worry About Me" is a song by British bassline collective Bad Boy Chiller Crew. It was released on 18 February 2021, via Relentless Records, as the first single from the group's EP Charva Anthems. It was later featured on their second album Disrespectful in February 2022. The song reached number 31 in the United Kingdom, as well as number 89 in Ireland.

Music video
The video for the song features the group riding around a field on an all-terrain vehicle performing stunts, in a hot tub joined by several women, and in their countryside retreat with a pool table and drinks.

Charts

Certifications

References

2021 songs